Septimus D. Clarke (1787–1859) was a farmer and leader within the Black community in Nova Scotia.

Clarke was one of thousands of Black refugees who escaped slavery in the United States during the War of 1812 and migrated to the British colony of Nova Scotia. In 1819, having cleared and planted all the land he had been granted, Clarke petitioned Governor Dalhousie for an additional , as the family required more trees for fuel. His was the first successful request for additional land by a Black immigrant, and encouraged others to apply for similar grants.

Clarke was active in a number of organizations within the Black community. In 1854 he cofounded the African United Baptist Association of Nova Scotia alongside Richard Preston. He also served as secretary and treasurer of the African Friendly Society and as president of the African Abolition Society. He supported reformist politicians who endorsed expanded rights for Black Nova Scotians.

Clarke died on 15 January 1859 in Preston, Nova Scotia, and his funeral service was held at the African Chapel in Halifax.

References

1787 births
1859 deaths
American former slaves
Black Nova Scotians
Black Refugees from the War of 1812
People from the Halifax Regional Municipality
18th-century African-American people
19th-century African-American people
African-American abolitionists
Baptist abolitionists
Canadian abolitionists
Canadian activists
Colony of Nova Scotia people